The Vision of the Valley of Dry Bones (or The Valley of Dry Bones or The Vision of Dry Bones) is a prophecy in chapter 37 of the Book of Ezekiel. The chapter details a vision revealed to the prophet Ezekiel, conveying a dream-like realistic-naturalistic depiction.

In his vision, the prophet sees himself standing in the valley full of dry human bones. He is commanded to carry a prophecy. Before him, the bones connect into human figures; then the bones become covered with tendon tissues, flesh and skin. Then God reveals the bones to the prophet as the people of Israel in exile and commands the prophet to carry another prophecy in order to revitalize these human figures, to resurrect them and to bring them to the Land of Israel.

Literary references
Herman Melville, early in his long story “Benito Cereno”, provides much description of the strange behavior and appearance of another ship, the San Dominick. As the captain and some crew of another ship get closer to it, Melville writes this paragraph:

The novelist Anthony Powell named The Valley of Bones, the seventh novel in the sequence A Dance to the Music of Time, for this part of Ezekiel 37. The novel is about the opening days of World War II. The entirety of the relevant part of Ezekiel 37 is read from the pulpit at the end of Chapter 1 by a Church of England padre to a motley group of mostly Welsh miners and bankers as well as some officers from England's upper classes as they begin to form a company. The padre suggests that not just they, but all of the British army as it prepares for war, should take this image as a way of thinking about how they need to come together. Unlike in Ezekiel, though, as the novel unfolds,

Poet Glauco Ortolano wrote a poem entitled Valley of the Dry Bones based on Ezekiel 37:

In popular culture 

James Weldon Johnson's spiritual "Dem Bones", also known as "Dry Bones", was inspired by Ezekiel's vision of the Valley of Dry Bones. It was first recorded by The Famous Myers Jubilee Singers in 1928.

The 2020 song "Rattle!" by Elevation Worship is based on the story of the dry bones.

References

Literature

 

Biblical dreams and visions
Bones
Book of Ezekiel
Prophecy